Le Flore, Leflore or LeFlore may refer to:

Places in the United States:
 LeFlore, Mississippi, Grenada County, an unincorporated community
 Leflore County, Mississippi
 LeFlore County, Oklahoma
 LeFlore, Oklahoma, a town in the county

Other uses:
 LeFlore (surname)
 LeFlore Magnet High School, Montgomery, Alabama